WBBL (96.5 MHz, "Alive 96.5" and "Pine Belt Solid Gospel") is a southern gospel music formatted FM radio station serving Hattiesburg, Laurel, and the Pine Belt region. The station is currently owned by Blakeney Communications. Its transmitter is located east of Richton, Mississippi.

Programming
WBBL is an affiliate of the Salem Radio Network. The station carries SRN News at the top of each hour during regular programming. Sunday mornings, WBBL airs the nationally syndicated program The Gospel Greats, hosted by Paul Heil. Monday nights, WBBL airs Gospel Grass, two hours of bluegrass music hosted by local broadcaster David McPhail.

On Sunday mornings, WBBL broadcasts a fifteen-minute inspirational message from the Ellisville Assembly of God Church, with Brother Morris.

On Sunday evenings, WBBL broadcasts an hour of inspirational religiously themed messages from Sanford Missionary Baptist Church, with Brother James Broome and then following Sanford, County Line Baptist Church with Brother Everette Broome. Although the churches are in close proximity to one another, and the two men know each other, they are not related.

WBBL also carries live coverage of sporting events involving local teams, including The University of Southern Mississippi baseball and women's basketball.

The station is an affiliate of the New Orleans Saints radio network.

References

External links
WBBL official website
alive.fm
Pine Belt Radio

The Gospel Greats website

BBL
Southern Gospel radio stations in the United States
Radio stations established in 1995
1995 establishments in Mississippi